Indeed is an American worldwide employment website for job listings launched in November 2004. It is a subsidiary of Japan's Recruit Co. Ltd. and is co-headquartered in Austin, Texas, and Stamford, Connecticut, with additional offices around the world. As a single-topic search engine, its central functionality is also an example of vertical search. Indeed is currently available in over 60 countries and 28 languages. In October 2010, Indeed.com passed Monster.com to become the highest-traffic job website in the United States.

The site aggregates job listings from thousands of websites, including job boards, staffing firms, associations, and company career pages. They generate revenue by selling premium job posting and resume features to employers and companies hiring. In 2011, Indeed began allowing job seekers to apply directly to jobs on Indeed's site and offering resume posting and storage.

History 
Indeed was co-founded by Paul Forster and Rony Kahan in 2004 in both Austin, Texas, and Stamford, Connecticut. The Stamford offices house the company's sales, client services, finance and human resources teams, while the product development staff is based in Austin.

In 2005, Indeed launched their beta version of their "pay-per-click job advertising network". In addition to searching job postings, it allows the occurrence of words therein to be plotted over time, ostensibly as an indicator of trends in the job markets. The company took an investment round of $5 million in funding from Union Square Ventures, The New York Times and Allen & Company.

Indeed operates in the UK via Indeed UK operations Ltd, which is a subsidiary of Indeed Operations Ireland Ltd, whose ultimate holding company is Recruit Holding Co Ltd. Turnover in the UK for the year to 31 December 2019 was £41.2m.

On October 1, 2012, Indeed became an independent operating unit of Japan-based Recruit Co. Ltd.

On July 1, 2016, Recruit Holdings Co., Ltd. announced that it had acquired the assets of Indeed's competitor Simply Hired, which would become a publishing partner of Indeed.

On June 21, 2018, Recruit Holdings Co., Ltd. announced that it had acquired the assets of Glassdoor, which will operate as a distinct and separate part of its growing HR Technology business segment, aligning Glassdoor and Indeed as sister companies.

On May 30, 2019, Indeed announced that it had signed an agreement to acquire Syft, a leading recruiting platform for the hospitality, event, and light industrial sectors in the UK.

On July 12, 2019, Indeed announced that it had signed an agreement to acquire ClickIQ, an automated job advertising technology platform based in the UK.

Sponsorship 
Indeed is currently the main sponsor of German football club Eintracht Frankfurt.

See also 
 Employment website
 List of employment websites

References

External links 
 

Recruit (company)
Business services companies established in 2004
Employment websites in the United States
Internet properties established in 2004
Companies based in Stamford, Connecticut
Companies based in Austin, Texas
2012 mergers and acquisitions
American subsidiaries of foreign companies
Professional networks